Giuseppe "Beppe" Signori (born 17 February 1968) is an Italian former professional footballer who played as a forward.

He played for several clubs in Italy throughout his career, and also had spells in Greece and Hungary with Iraklis Thessaloniki and MFC Sopron respectively. Signori won the Serie A top-scorer award three times and is one of the top ten scorers in Serie A history. At international level, Signori represented Italy 28 times between 1992 and 1995, scoring 7 goals, and took part at the 1994 World Cup, where they reached the final.

Club career 
Signori was born in Alzano Lombardo, Bergamo. As a youngster he played in the youth system of Internazionale, but was eventually released after being told by the club that he was too short to succeed as a professional. He went on to make his pro debut for Leffe (1984–86), followed by Piacenza (1986–87 and 1988–89), Trento (1987–88), Foggia (1989–92), Lazio (1992–97), Sampdoria (January–June 1998) and Bologna (1998–2004). He then spent two short periods abroad: first in Greece in 2004 with Iraklis Thessaloniki; and then in October 2005 he signed a one-year contract with Hungarian team MFC Sopron to end his professional career.

The pinnacle of Signori's career came at Lazio, where he was the top goalscorer in Serie A three times, in 1993, 1994, and 1996 (the last title shared with Igor Protti). In 1998, he was sold for an undisclosed figure to Sampdoria after being used more sparingly by the Lazio coach Sven-Göran Eriksson. At Bologna, he helped the club to qualify for the 1998–99 UEFA Cup by winning the 1998 UEFA Intertoto Cup that season. Bologna went on to reach the semi-finals of both the UEFA Cup and the Coppa Italia that season. Overall, he scored 188 goals in Italy's top division, the ninth highest in the history of the league, alongside Alessandro Del Piero and Alberto Gilardino.

Between 17 May 1992 and 28 February 1993, Signori scored in a record 10 consecutive away games in Serie A (1 in 1991–92 with Foggia, and 9 in 1992–93 with Lazio). Alongside Cristiano Ronaldo, he holds the records for most consecutive away games with at least one goal in a single season (9), which he set during the 1992–93 season with Lazio.

International career 
Signori was not able fully to translate his success to the national level, partly due to differences between him and national coach Arrigo Sacchi, who preferred to play him in the midfield, as a left winger, only using him as a forward on occasion, both as a striker and as a supporting forward. He played for the national side 28 times between 1992 and 1995, scoring seven goals. The only major tournament Signori played in was the 1994 FIFA World Cup, where he appeared six times as Italy finished in second place, but he did not play in the final against Brazil, as Italy were defeated on penalties after a 0–0 draw following extra time. Despite going scoreless during the tournament, he assisted Dino Baggio's match-winning goal against Norway in Italy's second group match, and Roberto Baggio's match-winning goal in the 87th minute of the quarter-final match against Spain.

Style of play 
Signori was a fast, hard-working, and diminutive left footed striker, who was a prolific goalscorer, due to his powerful and accurate shot, which drew frequent comparisons with Luigi Riva in the Italian media. A versatile forward, during the early part of his career he was used as a left winger or as a second striker, where his pace, excellent technique, and accurate crossing and passing ability were put to good use; in this position, he was known for his ability to cut in from the left flank and subsequently score by placing the ball at the far post with his left foot. He was also an extremely accurate set piece and penalty-kick taker, and was noted for his tendency to take set pieces and penalties without taking a run-up. When taking penalties, he often observed the keepers' movements, and attempted to send them the wrong first by waiting for them to dive before striking the ball. He scored 44 penalties from 52 attempts, making him one of the most accurate penalty takers in Serie A history, and the fifth most prolific spot kick taker of all time in the Italian league. Alongside Siniša Mihajlović, he is one of two players to have scored a hat-trick from free kicks in Serie A, a feat which he managed with Lazio in a 3–1 home win over Atalanta, on 10 April 1994. In training, in order to refine his accuracy from free kicks, he used to practise by attempting to curl the ball over artificial walls that were up to two metres in height, and that were placed closer to the ball than regulation distance. In addition to his goalscoring and ability as a footballer, he was also known for his leadership and mentality; however, despite his talent, he was also known to be injury prone. Signori was sponsored by Diadora and used to squeeze his feet into boots that were too small for him, claiming that this improved his touch and accuracy on the ball.

After retirement 
After working as a Serie A football pundit for RAI Radio1, he served as director of football of Ternana Calcio in 2008 and 2009.

On 1 June 2011, Signori was arrested in connection with a football betting scandal, together with other former players such as Stefano Bettarini and Mauro Bressan. He was initially placed under house arrest, until it was revoked two weeks later. On 9 August 2011, it was announced that he had been banned from any football-related activity for five years. On 23 February 2021, Signori was acquitted due to a "lack of evidence". On 1 June 2021, FIGC's President Gabriele Gravina pardoned Signori to be able to return to football.

Career statistics

Club

International

Honours 

Leffe
Campionato Interregionale: 1984-85 (Group B)

Piacenza
Serie C1: 1986-87

Foggia
Serie B: 1990–91

Bologna
UEFA Intertoto Cup: 1998

Italy
FIFA World Cup runner-up: 1994

Individual
Serie A top scorer: 1992–93, 1993–94, 1995–96 (shared with Igor Protti)
Coppa Italia top scorer: 1992–93, 1997–98
Guerin d'Oro: 1993
Premio Nazionale Carriera Esemplare "Gaetano Scirea": 2004

References

External links 

FIGC Profile   

1968 births
Living people
People from Alzano Lombardo
Italian footballers
Italy international footballers
Association football forwards
U.C. AlbinoLeffe players
Piacenza Calcio 1919 players
Calcio Foggia 1920 players
S.S. Lazio players
U.C. Sampdoria players
Bologna F.C. 1909 players
Iraklis Thessaloniki F.C. players
FC Sopron players
Serie A players
Serie B players
Serie C players
Serie D players
Super League Greece players
Nemzeti Bajnokság I players
1994 FIFA World Cup players
Italian expatriate footballers
Italian expatriate sportspeople in Hungary
Expatriate footballers in Greece
Expatriate footballers in Hungary
Italian expatriate sportspeople in Greece
Sportspeople from the Province of Bergamo
Footballers from Lombardy